The 2001 Canadian Olympic Curling Trials were held from December 1 to 9 at the Agridome in Regina, Saskatchewan. They were held to determine the Canadian National men's and women's Teams for the 2002 Winter Olympics.

Men

Teams

Final standings

Round-robin results

Draw 1
December 1, 12:30pm

Draw 2
December 2, 9:00am

Draw 3
December 2, 6:30pm

Draw 4
December 3, 1:30pm

Draw 5
December 5, 9:00am

Draw 6
December 4, 6:30pm

Draw 7
December 5, 1:30pm

Draw 8
December 6, 9:00am

Draw 9
December 6, 6:30pm

Playoffs

Semi-final
December 7, 6:30pm

Final
December 9, 12:30pm

Women

Teams

Final standings

Round-robin results

Draw 1
December 1, 8:30am

Draw 2
December 1, 7:30pm

Draw 3
December 2, 1:30pm

Draw 4
December 3, 9:00am

Draw 5
December 3, 6:30pm

Draw 6
December 4, 1:30pm

Draw 7
December 5, 9:00am

Draw 8
December 5, 6:30pm

Draw 9
December 6, 1:30pm

Playoffs

Semi-final
December 7, 1:30pm

Final
December 8, 12:30

External links
Men's results
Women's results
Women's final on YouTube
Men's final (last 3 ends) on YouTube

Sources

Canadian
Olympic
Canadian Olympic Curling Trials
Curling in Saskatchewan
2001 in Saskatchewan
December 2001 sports events in Canada
Curling at the 2002 Winter Olympics